The Stouffville Spirit are a Junior "A" ice hockey team from Whitchurch–Stouffville, Ontario, Canada. The Stouffville Spirit are members of the Central Canadian Hockey League of the Ontario Hockey Association.

History
From 1970 until 1984, the Stouffville Clippers were members of the Central Junior C Hockey League.  From 1984 until 1995, the team was on a long hiatus.  The Clippers were brought back in 1995, changed their name to the Spirit a season later, and have been members of the OPJHL ever since.
Junior hockey has a long and storied history in Stouffville.

The 1947 Stouffville Red Wings won an OHA championship. Junior hockey was popular in Stouffville through the 1960s, right into the early 1980s.

The Spirit was founded in 1995. George Stavro, who was granted the franchise by the Ontario Hockey Association, was the team's first coach and general manager. Junior hockey hadn't been played in Stouffville since 1984, when the OHA's junior C Stouffville Clippers folded.

But Stavro didn't last a full season in the Provincial Junior A Hockey League.

In mid-season, he sold the franchise to Stouffville businessman Ed Hakonson, who had tried to obtain a junior A franchise for Stouffville earlier in the '90s. Former Stouffville minor official Wally Crowder was named general manager, and Steve Sedore of Georgina head coach.

The Spirit struggled on and off the ice over the first three seasons. Sedore was replaced as coach by Stouffville minor hockey grad Dan Larmer. Larmer played junior hockey in southern Ontario and college hockey at Mercyhurst in Pennsylvania, before a brief pro career.

A move of home games at the Whitchurch-Stouffville Recreation Complex, from Saturday nights to Thursdays, improved attendance. But the Spirit didn't make the playoffs in its first three seasons.

A new regime took over Spirit hockey operations in 1998. New Spirit general manager Dieter Schmidt had been manager and head coach Brian Perrin was associate coach with the successful Newmarket Hurricanes' organization, before accepting promotions in Stouffville.

The Spirit has made the playoffs ever since. Its regular season record has improved annually.

Players have advanced to college and major junior hockey since Year 1 of the Spirit.

Hakonson sold shares in the hockey club to Stouffville-area resident Zeev Werek and Larry Goldberg in 1999, then sold the rest of the team to Werek and Goldberg a year later. David Laren joined the Spirit in 2002 as an equal partner. Goldberg left the group in 2005.

Schmidt retired as GM after the 2000-2001 season. His replacement is Stouffville native Ken Burrows, who in 10 years with the Spirit has been vice-president of hockey, assistant coach and scout.

A volunteer board of directors oversees the operation of the Spirit.

The Spirit is proud to be affiliated with the Whitchurch-Stouffville Minor Hockey Association and the Uxbridge Bruins Junior C Hockey Club.

Season-by-season results

Playoffs
1996 DNQ
1997 DNQ
1998 DNQ
1999 Lost Division Quarter-final
Collingwood Blues defeated Stouffville Spirit 3-games-to-none
2000 Lost Division Final
Stouffville Spirit defeated Aurora Tigers 4-games-to-none
Stouffville Spirit defeated Newmarket Hurricanes 4-games-to-2
Couchiching Terriers defeated Stouffville Spirit 4-games-to-none
2001 Lost Division Semi-final
Stouffville Spirit defeated Parry Sound Shamrocks 4-games-to-none
Couchiching Terriers defeated Stouffville Spirit 4-games-to-2
2002 Lost Division Quarter-final
Collingwood Blues defeated Stouffville Spirit 4-games-to-3
2003 Lost Division Final
Stouffville Spirit defeated Couchiching Terriers 4-games-to-none
Stouffville Spirit defeated Newmarket Hurricanes 4-games-to-3
Aurora Tigers defeated Stouffville Spirit 4-games-to-2
2004 Lost Division Semi-final
Stouffville Spirit defeated Thornhill Rattlers 4-games-to-2
Newmarket Hurricanes defeated Stouffville Spirit 4-games-to-1
2005 Lost Division Semi-final
Stouffville Spirit defeated Couchiching Terriers 4-games-to-2
Newmarket Hurricanes defeated Stouffville Spirit 4-games-to-2
2006 Lost Final
Stouffville Spirit defeated Seguin Bruins 4-games-to-2
Stouffville Spirit defeated Newmarket Hurricanes 4-games-to-2
Stouffville Spirit defeated Aurora Tigers 4-games-to-2
Stouffville Spirit defeated Oakville Blades 4-games-to-3
St. Michael's Buzzers defeated Stouffville Spirit 4-games-to-2
2007 Lost Division Final
Stouffville Spirit defeated Cobourg Cougars 4-games-to-none
Stouffville Spirit defeated Collingwood Blues 4-games-to-none
Aurora Tigers defeated Stouffville Spirit 4-games-to-1
2008 Lost Division Final
Stouffville Spirit defeated Couchiching Terriers 3-games-to-none
Stouffville Spirit defeated Huntsville Otters 4-games-to-3
Aurora Tigers defeated Stouffville Spirit 4-games-to-1
2009 Lost Division Quarter-final
Wellington Dukes defeated Stouffville Spirit 4-games-to-none
2010 Lost CCHL Preliminary
Peterborough Stars defeated Stouffville Spirit 4-games-to-none
2011 Lost Semi-final
Stouffville Spirit defeated Markham Waxers 4-games-to-2
Stouffville Spirit defeated Newmarket Hurricanes 4-games-to-3
Wellington Dukes defeated Stouffville Spirit 4-games-to-2

Notable alumni
Will Acton
Simon Gysbers
Christopher Tanev
Ethan Werek
Drake Caggiula

External links
Spirit Webpage

Ontario Provincial Junior A Hockey League teams
Whitchurch-Stouffville